Judge Pregerson may refer to:

Dean Pregerson (born 1951), judge of the United States District Court for the Central District of California
Harry Pregerson (1923–2017), judge appointed to the United States Court of Appeals for the Ninth Circuit